The National Alliance (abbrev: PN) is a political coalition composed of the Malaysian United Indigenous Party (Parti Pribumi Bersatu Malaysia; BERSATU), Malaysian Islamic Party (Parti Islam Se-Malaysia; PAS) and Malaysian People's Movement Party (Parti Gerakan Rakyat Malaysia; GERAKAN). This coalition was preceded by the Malaysian Party Alliance Association, also known as the Persatuan Perikatan Parti Malaysia (PPPM).

Perikatan Nasional was formed early in the 2020 Malaysian political crisis with the intention to replace the then-ruling Pakatan Harapan government. The 16th Yang di-Pertuan Agong, Abdullah of Pahang, appointed Muhyiddin Yassin, then the de facto leader of PN, as the 8th Prime Minister of Malaysia, bringing the informal political alliance into government. The coalition was the ruling government of Malaysia from March 2020 until August 2021, when Muhyiddin Yassin resigned as Prime Minister after the United Malays National Organisation (UMNO) withdrew its support, depriving PN of its majority in parliament.

As of December 2022, Perikatan Nasional controls 74 seats in the Dewan Rakyat.

History

2020 Malaysian political crisis and rise to power 

Since the morning of 23 February 2020, a faction from Parti Keadilan Rakyat led by its deputy president Azmin Ali who also served as Minister of Economic Affairs, BERSATU's Supreme Council, Muafakat Nasional of Malaysian Islamic Party-United Malays National Organisation pact retreat, UMNO's own Supreme Council, and GPS's member of the parliament; all held separate meetings in various locations. These meetings, particularly that of BERSATU and Azmin Ali's faction led to rumours that the formation of a new governing coalition was being undertaken. Later in the evening, an entourage of party leaders including Azmin, BERSATU President and then-Minister of Home Affairs Muhiyiddin, UMNO president Ahmad Zahid Hamidi, PAS president Hadi Awang, GPS chairman Abang Johari Openg and Parti Warisan Sabah president Shafie Apdal arrived at the Istana Negara to seek an audience with the Yang di-Pertuan Agong It was rumoured that the leaders were there to brief the Agong about the formation government and to declare their support for a new prime minister, effectively blocking PKR's president Anwar Ibrahim from the position. Once the meeting had concluded, several opposition party leaders, including UMNO's Ismail Sabri Yaakob and PAS's Hadi Awang then joined Azmin's supporters at Sheraton Hotel in Petaling Jaya. The purpose of the gathering was later revealed to be a dinner event called "Majlis Makan Malam Muafakat Ahli Parlimen" celebrating the achievement of a "consensus" among MPs, of which 131 were in attendance, from both the government and opposition. This sparked controversy as people began to wonder of the purpose and meaning of the event, causing a split in the Pakatan Harapan coalition. The events that day were dubbed the "Sheraton Move", and it was known as one of the longest Sundays in Malaysian politics.

It was later confirmed by former Prime Minister of Malaysia, Mohd. Najib Abdul Razak, that he, as well as MPs from the UMNO, signed statutory declarations in support of the then-Prime Minister of Malaysia, Mahathir Mohamad lead an alliance called Perikatan Nasional; however, their agreement was conditional.

On the following day, Azmin Ali and PKR vice-president Zuraida Kamaruddin were sacked from the party, as announced by secretary general, Saifuddin Nasution Ismail that afternoon, as several other members of the party announced their departure from the party in solidarity with the two. Following this, Mahathir announced his resignation from his position as Prime Minister, and BERSATU President, Muhyiddin Yassin, announced that the party would officially leave the Pakatan Harapan coalition. This caused the coalition to lose its majority in the Dewan Rakyat, marking the downfall of the almost 2 year old Pakatan Harapan government.

The royal palace announced that the Agong had accepted Mahathir's resignation and appointed him as interim Prime Minister in order to oversee the country's administration until the formation of a new government.

Having other plans in mind, Mahathir decided to call for all MPs to unite under a non-partisan unity government, where all parties in parliament would take part in the government. This was rejected by almost every other party as they refused to be in the same government as their rivals, most notably Muafakat Nasional (UMNO and PAS) and the DAP. Muafakat Nasional called for the dissolution of the parliament and snap elections, stating that the only solution was by letting the people choose the government.

To resolve the issue, the Agong summoned every member of the Dewan Rakyat for an audience so that he may interview each of them personally so as to determine who had the support of the majority of parliament to form a new government as Prime Minister. This is because Article 43 (2) (a) of the Federal Constitution of Malaysia states that the Yang di-Pertuan Agong shall need to appoint the Prime Minister from among the members of the Dewan Rakyat, who in his judgment is likely to command the confidence of the majority of the members of the parliament. However, none of them gained the majority support of the parliament, that is at least 112 members, since Barisan Nasional and PAS voted for the dissolution of the parliament, while Pakatan Harapan and BERSATU named Anwar Ibrahim and Mahathir respectively.

On the afternoon of 28 February, BERSATU Secretary-General Datuk Marzuki Yahaya announced that all of its 36 MPs have decided on nominating party president Muhyiddin for the position of Prime Minister instead of Mahathir. However, a number of BERSATU MPs later denied that they had nominated Muhiyiddin and were still supporting Mahathir. In the evening, both Barisan Nasional and Muafakat Nasional also announced their support for Muhiyiddin to succeed Mahathir as the next Prime Minister. This was soon followed by claims made by political analysts in Sabah and Sarawak that local parties such as GBS, GPS, and Warisan intended to support Muhiyiddin as Prime Minister, securing him a majority in parliament.

On the evening of the 29 February 2020, the Agong announced that Muhyiddin had gained majority support and was appointed as the 8th Prime Minister of Malaysia. He was sworn in the following day at Istana Negara.

Formalisation

This coalition previously preceded by the Malaysian Party Alliance Association or also known as the Persatuan Perikatan Parti Malaysia (PPPM). This association was led by two leaders. The Malaysian Party Alliance Association (PPPM) was led by Tan Sri Muhyiddin Yassin and Datuk Seri Panglima Jeffrey Gapari Kitingan (Leadership from, 3 March 2020 - 24 March 2020).

On 17 May 2020, the leaders of BERSATU, BN, PAS, GPS, PBS, and STAR issued a joint statement saying that all their 111 MPs support formalising the Perikatan Nasional alliance which was previously an ad hoc agreement and also a political association. The parties' leaders also announced that they had been working on a memorandum of understanding to facilitate cooperation within the PN alliance. Key provisions of the MOU include upholding the Malaysian Constitution, the sovereignty of the Malay Rulers, the principles of Rukun Negara, and ensuring the welfare and interest of Malaysians of all religions and race. The Registrar of Societies (RoS) confirmed on 14 September 2020 that Perikatan Nasional was registered on 7 August 2020 as Parti Perikatan Nasional (lit. Perikatan Nasional Party).

GERAKAN Party joined the coalition after GRS Alliance Party won in 2020 Sabah state election and became the 5th major-component in Perikatan Nasional.

First participation in an election

The first participation in an election for the National Alliance Party is in the 2020 Sabah state election. The party has made its first appearance in Sabah and won 17 state assembly seats, supporting the GRS Alliance Party. After the first appearance in the 2020 Sabah state election, the party then made a second appearance in the 2021 Malacca state election, and then made a third appearance in the 2022 Johor state election.

Member parties

Former member parties 
 Homeland Solidarity Party (STAR), (2020–2022)
 Malaysian United Indigenous Party of Sabah (Sabah BERSATU), (2020–2022)
 Sabah Progressive Party (SAPP), (2020–2022)

Leadership structure 

Perikatan Nasional Party leadership structure :

Party 

 Chairman:
 Muhyiddin Yassin (BERSATU)
 Deputy Chairman:
 Abdul Hadi Awang (PAS)
 Dominic Lau Hoe Chai (GERAKAN)
 Ahmad Faizal Azumu (BERSATU)
 Secretary-General:
 Hamzah Zainuddin (BERSATU)
 Treasurer-General:
 Ahmad Samsuri Mokhtar (PAS)
 Information Chief:
 Mohamed Azmin Ali (BERSATU)
 Assistant Secretary General:
 Takiyuddin Hassan (PAS)
 Women Chief:
 Rina Harun (BERSATU)
 Youth Chief:
 Ahmad Fadhli Shaari (PAS)
 Supreme Council Members:
 Ronald Kiandee (BERSATU)
 Oh Tong Keong (GERAKAN)
 Elections Director:
 Mohamed Azmin Ali (BERSATU)
 Deputy Elections Director:
 Takiyuddin Hassan (PAS)
 Executive Secretary:
 Saiful Adli Mohd Arshad (BERSATU)
 State Chairman:
 Johor: Sahruddin Jamal (BERSATU)
 Kedah: Muhammad Sanusi Md Nor (PAS)
 Kelantan: Ahmad Yakob (PAS)
 Malacca: Mohd Yadzil Yaakub (BERSATU)
 Negeri Sembilan: Eddin Syazlee Shith (BERSATU)
 Pahang: Saifuddin Abdullah (BERSATU)
 Penang: Dominic Lau Hoe Chai (GERAKAN)
 Perak: Ahmad Faizal Azumu (BERSATU)
 Perlis: Mohd. Shukri Ramli (PAS)
 Sabah: Ronald Kiandee (BERSATU)
 Sarawak: Jaziri Alkaf Suffian (BERSATU)
 Selangor: Mohamed Azmin Ali (BERSATU)
 Terengganu: Ahmad Samsuri Mokhtar (PAS)
 Federal Territories: Muhammad Suhaimi Yahya (BERSATU)

Elected representatives

Dewan Negara (Senate)

Senators 

 His Majesty's appointee:
 Balasubramaniam Nachiappan (PAS)
 Aknan Ehtook (BERSATU)
 Isa Ab. Hamid (BERSATU)
 Jaziri Alkaf Suffian (BERSATU)
 Md Nasir Hashim (BERSATU)
 Muhammad Zahid Md. Arip (BERSATU)
 Razali Idris (BERSATU)
 Rais Yatim (BERSATU)
 Teo Eng Tee (GERAKAN)
 Dominic Lau Hoe Chai (GERAKAN)
 Kedah State Legislative Assembly:
 Abd Nasir Idris (PAS)
 Musoddak Ahmad (PAS)
 Kelantan State Legislative Assembly:
 Mohd Apandi Mohamad (PAS)
 Wan Martina (PAS)
 Terengganu State Legislative Assembly:
 Hussin Awang (PAS)
 Hussin Ismail (PAS)

Members of Parliament of the 15th Malaysian Parliament 
Perikatan Nasional have 74 MPs in the Dewan Rakyat as shown below.

Dewan Undangan Negeri (State Legislative Assembly)

Malaysian State Assembly Representatives 

Perlis State Legislative Assembly

Kelantan State Legislative Assembly

Terengganu State Legislative Assembly

Kedah State Legislative Assembly

Perak State Legislative Assembly

Pahang State Legislative Assembly

Penang State Legislative Assembly

Selangor State Legislative Assembly

Malacca State Legislative Assembly

Johor State Legislative Assembly

Sabah State Legislative Assembly

Negeri Sembilan State Legislative Assembly

Sarawak State Legislative Assembly

Perikatan Nasional state governments

General election results

State election results

Notes

Further reading 
 James Chin (2020) Malaysia: the 2020 putsch for Malay Islam supremacy . The Round Table 109(3):288-297. DOI: 10.1080/00358533.2020.1760495
 James Chin (2020) The new ruling coalition Malaysia takes a turn to the right, and many of its people are worried, The Conversation, March 2020

References 

Political party alliances in Malaysia
Political parties established in 2020
2020 establishments in Malaysia